Euphorbia decorsei is a species of plant in the family Euphorbiaceae. It is endemic to Madagascar and its natural habitat is subtropical or tropical dry forests. However, it is threatened by habitat loss.

References

Endemic flora of Madagascar
decorsei
Endangered plants
Taxonomy articles created by Polbot